Ushuru Football Club is a Kenyan football club based in Nairobi. They play their home games at the Public Service Grounds, which have a capacity of 5,000.

The Kenya Revenue Authority is the club's main sponsor, and until 11 October 2014, the club was known as Kenya Revenue Authority Football Club.

References

Kenyan Premier League clubs
FKF Division One clubs
Football clubs in Kenya